Dandaniya, also spelled Dandaniyah, Dendeniyê or Dandānīyah, is a village located  west-north-west of Manbij in northern Syria. In the 2004 census, it had a population of 683.

Syrian civil war

On 25 August 2016, the village was reportedly attacked with chemical weapons.

References

Manbij District